Oligodon is genus of colubrid snakes that was first described by the Austrian zoologist Fitzinger in 1826. This genus is widespread throughout central and tropical Asia. The snakes of this genus are commonly known as kukri snakes..

Description 
They are egg eaters and are usually under 90 cm (35 in) in length; different species display widely variable patterns and colorations.  They subsist mostly by scavenging the eggs of birds and reptiles. Besides eggs, species of this genus also feeds on lizards, frogs, and small rodents.
Oligodon is a rear-fanged snake genus. They have a set of enlarged teeth placed in the back of their mouths, as well as functional Duvernoy's glands. They are not dangerous to humans, though. Bites by some species have been reported to bleed excessively, suggesting presence of anticoagulants in the Duvernoy's gland secretions. Species of Oligodon are mostly nocturnal, and live on the floor of mature forests.

The common name of the genus comes from the kukri, a distinctively shaped Nepalese knife, which is similar in shape to the broad, flattened, curved hind teeth of Oligodon species.  These teeth are specially adapted for their main diet of eggs; the teeth cut open eggs as they are being swallowed by the snake, allowing for easier digestion.

Species 
There are 86 recognized species in the genus Oligodon according to Reptile Database as of April 2022

The source column gives direct links to the sources used:
 IUCN description of species at International Union for Conservation of Nature Red List of Threatened Species. IUCN Red List categories are:
 - Extinct,  - Extinct in the Wild
 - Critically Endangered,  - Endangered,  - Vulnerable
 - Near Threatened,  - Least Concern
 - Data Deficient,  - Not Evaluated
 RDB description of species at Reptile Database.

Nota bene: A binomial authority in parentheses indicates that the species was originally described in a genus other than Oligodon.

References

External links 
 "Kukri snake". Encyclopædia Britannica. Retrieved July 7, 2005.
 "Brown Kukri Snake". Wildlife Singapore. Retrieved July 7, 2005

Further reading 
 Green, Marc D.; Orlov, Nikolai L.; Murphy, Robert W. (2010). "Toward a Phylogeny of the Kukri Snakes, Genus Oligodon ". Asian Herpetological Research 2 (1): 1-21.
 Smith MA (1943). The Fauna of British India, Ceylon and Burma, Including the Whole of the Indo-Chinese Sub-region. Reptilia and Amphibia. Vol. III.—Serpentes. London: Secretary of State for India. (Taylor and Francis, printers). xii + 583 pp. (Genus Oligodon, pp. 195–201).

 
Taxa named by Leopold Fitzinger
Snake genera